Biso may refer to:

 Biso, Bishop of Paderborn (887–923)
 Bise, a dry, warm wind in France and Switzerland
 Mattia Biso, Italian footballer
 BISO, BIstructural ISOtropic (coated fuel particle)
 Biso, Uganda, a town in the Western Region of the county